Brendan Gallagher (born May 6, 1992) is a Canadian professional ice hockey winger and alternate captain for the Montreal Canadiens of the National Hockey League (NHL). He was selected by the Canadiens in the fifth round, 147th overall, of the 2010 NHL Entry Draft.

During his four-year junior career, Gallagher received Western Hockey League (WHL) West First All-Star Team honors (2010–11) and became the Vancouver Giants' all-time leading goal- and point-scorer. Internationally, he won a bronze medal with Canada at the 2012 IIHF U20 Championships, alongside a gold medal with Canada at the 2016 IIHF World Championships.

Playing career

Junior

Playing in the South Delta Minor Hockey Association, Gallagher was selected in the ninth round of the 2007 WHL Bantam Draft by the Vancouver Giants. He joined the Giants for his WHL rookie season in 2008–09. Gallagher scored his first WHL goal against goaltender Kevin Armstrong on September 27, 2008, in a 7–3 win over the Prince George Cougars. After finishing the regular season with 10 goals and 31 points over 52 games, he added three points (one goal, two assists) in 16 post-season contests, as the Giants were eliminated in the semifinals by the Kelowna Rockets. The following season, Gallagher improved to 81 points over 72 games, ranking second among Giants players, behind Craig Cunningham, while his 41 goals were a team high. Gallagher's efforts continued in the post-season, helping the Giants to the semifinals for his second consecutive year with the club. He registered 21 points (11 goals and 10 assists) in 16 games, second in team-scoring and fifth in the league, as Vancouver was eliminated by the Tri-City Americans.

During the 2010 playoffs, Gallagher was selected as the Male Youth Athlete of the Year in his hometown of Delta, British Columbia. In anticipation of the 2010 NHL Entry Draft, he was ranked 152nd among North American skaters eligible to be selected by the NHL Central Scouting Bureau. Gallagher was selected 147th overall by the Montreal Canadiens. Returning to junior following his first training camp with the Canadiens, he recorded WHL career highs in 2010–11. On February 28, 2011, he was named WHL Player of the Week after recording ten points (five goals and five assists) in three games. In March 2011, Gallagher was sidelined with a head injury, sustained after receiving a hit in a game against the Portland Winterhawks. Ranking first on the Giants and eighth among all WHL scorers with 91 points over 66 games, he was named to the WHL West First All-Star Team. His 44 goals were just four shy of Evander Kane's single-season team record.

Appearing in his second training camp with the Canadiens, Gallagher competed for a roster spot, remaining with the team until the final days leading up to the 2011–12 season. After being returned to junior, the Canadiens signed him to a three-year, entry-level contract on November 16, 2011. The following month, Gallagher temporarily left the Giants for the Canadian national junior team. In his first game back, on January 7, 2012, he recorded a seven-point night, which included a hat-trick, in an 8–4 win against the Portland Winterhawks. Three days later, he assumed the team captaincy after previous captain James Henry was traded away to the Moose Jaw Warriors. In the same week, during a game against the Tri-City Americans, Gallagher sustained an upper-body injury after colliding into the boards while pursuing a loose puck. Earlier in the shift, he had also received an open-ice hit. Gallagher returned to the line-up by late January and, the following month, he broke the Giants' records for most goals and points all-time, both set by Adam Courchaine seven years prior. With a hat-trick against the Tri-City Americans on February 14, Gallagher surpassed Courchaine's mark of 126 goals. Eleven days later, he recorded two goals in a 5–3 win against the Kamloops Blazers for his record-setting 274th point as a Giant. Near the end of the season, he was voted by WHL players, executives and broadcasters as the most valuable player to his team in the Tri-City Herald's annual survey.

During his junior career, Gallagher has earned a reputation as a fast-skating scorer who plays with energy and aggression, making him adept at playing in offensive and defensive situations.

Professional
In his first professional season, Gallagher was directly assigned to the Canadiens' American Hockey League (AHL) affiliate, the Hamilton Bulldogs, due to the 2012–13 NHL lockout. Upon a resolution, Gallagher was recalled to the Canadiens' training camp for the shortened 2012–13 season. He scored his first NHL goal on January 27, 2013, against Martin Brodeur in a 4–3 win over the New Jersey Devils. After the trade of Michael Ryder back to the Canadiens, Gallagher switched from jersey number 73 to 11 to accommodate the veteran Ryder, who has worn 73 throughout his NHL career. It was later revealed in 2019, that Ryder offered Gallagher a Rolex in return of the number 73, Ryder never filled his promise. Gallagher ended the season with a total of 15 goals and 13 assists in 44 games and established himself as a key member of Montreal's offence, often playing on the Canadiens' first line. On May 6, 2013, Gallagher was also nominated for the Calder Memorial Trophy, awarded to the NHL's Rookie of the Year, and placed second in voting.

On November 29, 2014, the Canadiens came to terms with Gallagher on a six-year contract extension.

On September 18, 2015 it was announced that Gallagher would become one of the alternate captains of the Montreal Canadiens along with P. K. Subban, Tomáš Plekanec, and Andrei Markov. During the 2015–16 season, Gallagher broke two fingers after blocking a shot from Johnny Boychuk and would require surgery to fix them. He returned to the Canadiens lineup for the 2016 NHL Winter Classic.

During the 2016–17 season, Gallagher broke his hand, requiring surgery, and was labelled to be out for eight weeks.

The following season was a career year for Gallagher, despite the Canadiens not qualifying for the postseason. Gallagher was placed on a shutdown line along with Plekanec and led the team in even-strength points. Gallagher ended the regular season with a career-high 54 points. At the conclusion of the season, Gallagher was nominated for the King Clancy Memorial Trophy as a player who best exemplifies leadership qualities and gives back to the community.

For the 2018–19 season, Gallagher was once again named an alternate captain for the Canadiens along with Paul Byron. On February 21, 2019, Gallagher recorded his first career hat trick in a 5–1 win against the Philadelphia Flyers. October 30, 2019 he played in his 500th career game in the NHL and scored a goal that night to beat the Coyotes in Phoenix, Arizona. Brendan was awarded the Molson Cup by the Montreal Canadiens for the month of October 2019.

On October 14, 2020, Gallagher signed a six-year, $39 million contract extension with the Canadiens.

On May 31, 2021, Gallagher scored the critical first goal of Game 7 against the Toronto Maple Leafs after the Leafs' Mitch Marner accidentally passed the puck to him. The Canadiens ultimately won the game 3-1 to complete their comeback from a 3-1 series deficit in the first round of the 2021 Stanley Cup playoffs. On June 1, Gallagher netted the game winner in Game 1 against the Winnipeg Jets, whom the Canadiens swept in the second round. On June 24, Gallagher had an assist on Artturi Lehkonen's semifinal series winner in Game 6 overtime against the Vegas Golden Knights, sending the Canadiens to their first Stanley Cup Final in 28 years. The Canadiens lost the Final in five games to the defending champions Tampa Bay Lightning.

Following the Canadiens' appearance in the Stanley Cup Final, the 2021–22 season was a struggle for both the team and for Gallagher individually. Due to both injuries and a severe bout of COVID-19 he missed twenty-six games, and, after four consecutive years as one of the league's most dominant forwards during five-on-five play, would not score a goal at even strength until an April 5, 2022 game against the Ottawa Senators. The Canadiens' new coach, Martin St-Louis, expressed a desire to "rewire" Gallagher's approach to playing the game to "use up less physical energy by playing a bit more of a mental game." Finishing with 7 goals and 17 assists, the worst season of his career to date, Gallagher would later say that the main consolation was a four-month offseason that would enable him to recover his health and strength while working with his father Ian. There was some discussion of Gallagher being named the team's new captain following the departure of Shea Weber, but this was instead given to Nick Suzuki.

International play

In his third WHL season, Gallagher was invited to the Canadian junior team's World Junior selection camp in December 2010. Failing to make the roster, he was among the initial cuts. The following year, Gallagher made the team for the 2012 World Junior Championships, held in Alberta. In the last contest of the preliminary round, Gallagher was named Canada's player of the game after recording a game-high seven shots on goal in a 3–2 win against the United States. In the semifinal, Gallagher recorded a goal and two assists on Canada's last three goals, helping them get within one goal of erasing a 6–1 deficit against Russia. Canada went on to win their bronze medal game against Finland 4–0. Gallagher finished the tournament with six points (three goals and three assists), tying for fifth in team scoring, while leading Canada with 35 shots on goal. Gallagher was also a part of Team Canada in the 2016 IIHF World Championship. During the tournament, he scored 2 goals and 3 assists for a total of 5 points in ten games as Canada won gold.

Personal life
Gallagher was born in Edmonton, Alberta, but grew up in Tsawwassen, British Columbia, after moving there with his family at the age of 12. As a youth, he played in the 2005 Quebec International Pee-Wee Hockey Tournament with a minor ice hockey team from Burnaby.

His father Ian, is a strength and conditioning coach for the Vancouver Giants. Prior to joining the Giants himself as a player, Gallagher was familiarized with the team through Ian's work. He has identified Adam Courchaine, Mitch Bartley and Gilbert Brule as his favourite Giants players growing up. The first of these was the all-time record holder for points by a Giants player, a mark that Gallagher surpassed in the 2011–12 season.

In January 2014, McDonald's introduced the "Gallagher burger" in its Quebec restaurants. Gallagher again created a signature burger for McDonalds before the 2016 NHL season, along with teammate Alex Galchenyuk (who created one of his own).

Gallagher is a supporter of Tottenham Hotspur F.C. and the Cincinnati Bengals

Career statistics

Regular season and playoffs

International

Awards

Records
Vancouver Giants all-time goals leader – 136 (surpassed Adam Courchaine, 126 goals from 2001–05)
Vancouver Giants all-time points leader – 280  (surpassed Adam Courchaine, 273 points from 2001–05)

References

External links

1992 births
Canadian ice hockey right wingers
Hamilton Bulldogs (AHL) players
Ice hockey people from British Columbia
Laval Rocket players
Living people
Montreal Canadiens draft picks
Montreal Canadiens players
People from Delta, British Columbia
Ice hockey people from Edmonton
Vancouver Giants players